I Am an Elastic Firecracker (stylized as i am an ELASTIC FIRECRACKER) is the second studio album by Tripping Daisy, released on June 20, 1995 through Island Records. It is the band's major label debut, and was produced by Ted Niceley. It featured the band's biggest hit, "I Got a Girl", whose video received extensive airplay on MTV. By 1998, the album had sold over 300,000 copies in the United States. The album was certified Platinum in Canada on May 1, 1998.

Cover art 
The album's cover art features a photo of Italian artist Guglielmo Achille Cavellini.  The photo originated as a piece of stamp art by E.F. Higgins.

Accolades

Track listing 

All songs have stylized capitalization wherever they are mentioned.

Charts

Release history

References

1995 albums
Island Records albums
Tripping Daisy albums
Albums produced by Ted Niceley